Ciro Berardi (1909–1961) was an Italian actor.

Selected filmography
 Light in the Darkness (1941)
 Lucky Night (1941)
 Street of the Five Moons (1942)
 After Casanova's Fashion (1942)
 Love Story (1942)
 The Peddler and the Lady (1943)
 A Living Statue (1943)
 The Ten Commandments (1945)
 Romulus and the Sabines (1945)
 The Opium Den (1947)
 The Street Has Many Dreams (1948)
 Night Taxi (1950)
 The Beggar's Daughter (1950)
 Free Escape (1951)
 Stasera sciopero (1951)
 Cops and Robbers (1951)

References

Bibliography
 Ennio Bìspuri. Totò: principe clown : tutti i film di Totò. Guida Editori, 1997.

External links

1909 births
1961 deaths
Italian male film actors